The Wachthubel (1,415 m) is a mountain of the Emmental Alps, located on the border between the Swiss cantons of Bern and Lucerne. The mountain is located between Schangnau and Marbach.

References

External links
Wachthubel on Hikr

Mountains of the Alps
Mountains of Switzerland
Mountains of the canton of Bern
Mountains of the canton of Lucerne
Bern–Lucerne border
One-thousanders of Switzerland